The World Federation for Mental Health (WFMH) is an international, multi-professional non-governmental organization (NGO), including citizen volunteers and former patients. It was founded in 1948 in the same era as the United Nations (UN) and the World Health Organization (WHO).

Aims
The goal of this international organization includes; 
The prevention of mental and emotional disorders;
The proper treatment and care of those with such disorders;
And the promotion of mental health

The Federation, through its members and contacts in more than 94 countries on six continents, has responded to international mental health crises through its role as the only worldwide grassroots advocacy and public education organization in the mental health field. Its organizational and individual membership includes mental health workers of all disciplines, consumers of mental health services, family members, and concerned citizens. At its very outset the WFMH was concerned with educating both the public and influential professionals, and with human relations, with a view both to the health of individuals and that of groups and nations. The WFMH founding document, "Mental Health and World Citizenship", understood "world citizenship" in terms of a "common humanity" respecting individual and cultural differences, and declared that "the ultimate goal of mental health is to help [people] live with their fellows in one world.

Members include mental health service providers and service users. In 2009, the World Fellowship for Schizophrenia and Allied Disorders, an international network of families of people with serious mental illness, merged with the World Federation. The World Federation has close ties with the World Health Organization. For many years after its founding, the WFMH was the only NGO of its kind with a close working relationship with UN agencies, particularly the WHO. In recent decades, though, a number of international mental health organizations, often limited to members of particular professions, have developed. In varying degree they have filled needs formerly addressed mainly by WFMH. The WFMH envisions a world in which mental health is a priority for all people. Public policies and programs reflect the crucial importance of mental health in the lives of individuals. The first Director General of the WHO, G. Brock Chisholm, who was a psychiatrist, was one of the leaders in forming the federation with the goal of creating a representative organization that could consult with the UN on mental health issues.

The mission of the World Federation for Mental Health is to promote the advancement of mental health awareness, prevention of mental disorders, advocacy, and best practice recovery focused interventions worldwide. Mental health day is celebrated at the initiative of the World Federation of Mental Health and WHO supports this initiative through raising awareness on mental health issues using its strong relationships with the Ministries of health and civil society organizations across the globe. Mental Illness Awareness Week (MIAW) is an annual national public education campaign designed to help open the eyes of Canadians to the reality of mental illness. The week was established in 1992 by the Canadian Psychiatric Association, and is now coordinated by the Canadian Alliance on Mental Illness and Mental Health (CAMIMH) in cooperation with all its member organizations and many other supporters across Canada.

List of presidents
 John Rawlings Rees (1948) - London, England
Dr. Andre Repond (1949-1950) 
Prof. W. Line (1950-1951) - Toronto, Canada
Prof. Alfonso Millan (1951-1952) - Mexico, DF
Dr. M.K. el Kholy (1952-1953) - Cairo, Egypt
Prof. H.C. Rumke (1953-1954) - Utrecht, Netherlands
 Dr. Frank Fremont-Smith (1954-1955) - New York, USA
Prof. Nilo Maki (1955-1956) - Helsinki, Finland
Dr. Eduardo Enrique Krapf (1956-1957) - Buenos Aires, Argentina
 Dr. Margaret Mead (1957-1958) - New York, USA
 Dr. Brock Chisholm (1957-1958) - Victoria, Canada
Prof. Hans Hoff (1959-1960) - Vienna, Austria
Prof. Paul Sivadon (1960-1961) - Paris, France
Prof. A.C. Pacheco de Silva (1961-1962) - São Paulo, Brazil
Dr. George S Stevenson (1961-1962) - New York, USA
Dr. Phon Sangsingkeo (1962-1963) - Bangkok, Thailand
Prof. G.P. Alivisatos (1963-1964) - Athens, Greece
Dr. Alan Stoller (1964-1965) - Victoria, Australia
Sir Samual Manuwa (1965-1966) - Lagos, Nigeria
Dr. Otto Klineberg (1966-1967) - Canada
Prof. Morris Carstairs (1968-1972) - Edinburgh, Scotland
 Prof. Michael Beaubrun (1972-1974) - Kingston, Jamaica
 Prof. Tsung-yi Lin (1975-1979) - Vancouver, Canada
 Mr. Gowan Guest (1979-1981) - Esq, Vancouver, Canada
 Prof. Eugene Brody (1981-1983) - Baltimore, USA
Dr. Estefania Aldaba-Lim (1983-1985) - Manila, Philippines
Mrs. Edith Morgan (1985-1987) - London, England
Dr. Gamal M. Abou El Azayem (1987-1989) - Cairo, Egypt
Dr. Stanislas Flache (1989-1991) - Geneva, Switzerland
Dr. Max W. Abbott (1991-1993) - Auckland, New Zealand
Dr. Federico Puente-Silva (1993-1995) - Mexico DF, Mexico
Mrs. Beverly B. Long, Georgia (1995-1997) - USA
Prof. Marten deVries (1997-1999) - Maastricht, Netherlands
Dr. Ahmed Abou El Azayem (1999-2001) - Cairo, Egypt
Mrs. Pirkko Lahti (2001-2003) - Helsinki, Finland
Dr. Patt Franciosi (2003-2005) - Wisconsin, USA
Mrs. Shona Sturgeon (2005-2007) - Cape Town, South Africa
Prof. John R.M. Copeland (2007-2009) - London, England
Mr. Anthony Fowke (2009-2011) - Perth, Australia
Mrs. Deborah Wan (2011-2013) - Hong Kong, SAR
Prof. George Christodoulou (2013-2015) - Greece
Dr. Gabriel Ivbijaro (2015-2017) - United Kingdom
Dr. Alberto Trimboli (2017-2019) - Argentina
Ingrid Daniels (2019 to 2021) - South Africa
Nasser Loza (2021 to 2023) - Egypt

Notable members 
 Helmuth Ehrhardt – Executive board member
 Werner Villinger – German psychiatrist, educating the public 
 Tsung-yi Lin – Honorary president
 Eugene Brody – President, 1981 to 1983; Secretary General from 1983 to 1999.

Conferences and Congresses

World Mental Health Day

References

External links
World Federation for Mental Health – Official website

World Fellowship for Schizophrenia and Allied Disorders – 'Information for families caring for people with mental illness'
 – World Health Organization, Mental Health, Home Page

Organizations established in 1948
Psychology organizations
International medical and health organizations
Mental health organizations in the United States
International organizations based in the United States